Westons Mills or Westons Mill is an unincorporated community located along the border of East Brunswick and New Brunswick in Middlesex County, New Jersey, United States. It is the location of Westons Mill Pond.

See also
 Edward S. Kearney House – listed on the NRHP

References

East Brunswick, New Jersey
Neighborhoods in New Brunswick, New Jersey
Unincorporated communities in New Jersey